Olympiacos (Table Tennis) department was established in 1956 and has both a men's and a women's department. Olympiacos is one of the most succesfull clubs in Greek table tennis history, with its women's department being the most successful, having won a record 27 Greek Leagues and a record 11 Greek Cups. 

Olympiacos men's department are the only Greek men's table tennis team that have won a European title, having won the ETTU Europe Trophy in 2022–23. They have also won 15 Greek Leagues and 7 Greek Cups.

Honours

European competitions

Men
 ETTU Europe Trophy
 Winners (1) (shared record): 2022–23

Domestic competitions

Men
 Greek League
 Winners (15): 1971, 1972, 1973, 1974, 1976, 1977, 1978, 1980, 2004, 2005, 2014,2016,2017, 2018, 2022.
 Greek Cup
 Winners (7): 1971, 1972, 2003, 2004, 2005, 2008, 2022.

Women
 Greek League
 Winners (27) (record): 1954, 1955, 1956, 1957, 1958, 1959, 1960, 1961, 1962, 1964, 1965, 1976, 1977, 1978, 1979, 1981, 1982, 1983, 2000, 2001, 2002, 2005, 2006, 2007, 2009, 2018, 2022
 Greek Cup
 Winners (11) (record): 1965, 1966, 1983, 1984, 1985, 1986, 2001, 2005, 2006, 2007, 2008.

European Honours

References 

Table tennis in Greece
Table tennis
Table tennis clubs